Rock Solid Guitar is the seventh studio album by guitarist David T. Chastain. The last song on the album, "Hats Off to Angus and Malcolm", is Chastain's tribute to the AC/DC brothers, Angus and Malcolm Young.

Track listing
All songs by David T. Chastain, except where noted

"Burning Passions" - 4:39
"Sounds Cool to Me" - 5:28
"Dancing with the Devil's Mistress" - 4:49 
"Never Too Much" (Chastain, Luther Vandross) - 4:50
"Getting a Little Crazy" - 3:52
"In Memoriam" - 4:34
"Riding In Style" - 4:07
"Keeper of Tomorrow" - 4:29
"Hats Off to Angus and Malcolm" - 6:58

Musicians
David T. Chastain - Electric Guitar
Mike Haid - Drums
Don Mitchell - Photography
Steven Taylor - Bass, Graphic Design
Luther Vandross - Composer

References

2001 albums